Haldensleben is a railway station in the town of Haldensleben, Saxony-Anhalt, Germany. The station lies on the Oebisfelde–Magdeburg railway and the train services are operated by Deutsche Bahn.

Train services
The station is served by the following services:

regional service  Wolfsburg - Oebisfelde - Haldensleben - Magdeburg

References

Railway stations in Saxony-Anhalt
Buildings and structures in Börde (district)